The 2005–06 Algerian Cup was the 42nd edition of the Algerian Cup in the sport of football. MC Alger won the Cup by defeating city rivals USM Alger 2-1 in the final with two goals from Noureddine Daham. It was MC Alger's fifth Algerian Cup in its history and its first in 23 years.

Round of 16

Quarter-finals

Semi-finals

Final
Kickoff times are in local time.

Champions

External links
 Coupe d'Algérie 2006
 2006/07 Coupe Nationale

Algerian Cup
Algerian Cup
Algerian Cup